The Uyghur Latin alphabet (Uyghur Latin Yëziqi, ULY, Уйғур Латин Йезиқи) is an auxiliary alphabet for the Uyghur language based on the Latin script. Uyghur is primarily written in an Arabic alphabet and sometimes in a Cyrillic alphabet.

Construction
The ULY project was finalized at Xinjiang University, Ürümqi, Xinjiang Uyghur Autonomous Region (XUAR), People's Republic of China in July 2001, at the fifth conference of a series held there for that purpose that started in November 2000. In January 2008, the ULY project was amended and identified by Xinjiang Uyghur Autonomous Regional Working Committee of Minorities' Language and Writing.

The letters in the ULY are, in order:

Purpose
The creators of ULY strongly emphasized that “the proposed alphabet should not replace [the Persian-Arab Uyghur alphabet] nor should its introduction represent a new reform of the writing system. It is to be used solely in computer-related fields as an ancillary writing system”.

Public reception
ULY had a heavy public relations presence on both the Internet and official Xinjiang Uyghur Autonomous Region media but despite official efforts to play down the sense of a massive reform, ULY has acquired that connotation and the public seems wary of it. The importance of having one-to-one correspondence between Latin and Arabic is noteworthy.

Comparison of orthographies
The different orthographies are compared in the following table.

Text example
Below follows an example of the Universal Declaration of Human Rights (Article 1) in Uyghur:

See also
Uyghur Ereb Yëziqi
Uyghur alphabets

References

Further reading
 

Uyghur language
Latin-script orthographies
Latin alphabets
Romanization
Alphabets used by Turkic languages